Jämtland County held a county council election on 14 September 2014, on the same day as the general and municipal elections.

Results
The number of seats remained at 55 with the Social Democrats winning the most at 21, a drop of three from 2010. The party received near 38.6% of a valid vote of 81,485.

Municipalities

Images

References

Elections in Jämtland County
Jämtland